Jorge Luis Lona (23 November 1935 – 19 August 2022) was an Argentine Roman Catholic prelate.

Lona was born in Argentina and was ordained to the priesthood in 1979. He served as the coadjutor bishop of the Diocese of San Luis in 2000 and 2001 and as bishop of the diocese from 2001 until his retirement in 2011.

References

External links

1935 births
2022 deaths
21st-century Roman Catholic bishops
Roman Catholic bishops of San Luis
Bishops appointed by Pope John Paul II